Mount Steller is a peak at the far eastern end of the Chugach Mountains of Alaska, United States. It is notable for its isolated location among extensive icefields, and for its large rise above local terrain. For example, it rises 8000 feet (2440 m) above the Bering Glacier to the south in about 4 horizontal miles (6.4 km).

Mount Steller is the high point of Waxell Ridge, an east–west trending ridge on the south side of the Bagley Icefield, one of the largest icefields in North America. The large Bering Glacier flows past the east and south slopes of the ridge, while the Steller Glacier flows from its west side.

The mountain was named for the naturalist Georg Wilhelm Steller.

Due to its isolated location, poor weather, and comparatively low absolute elevation by Alaskan standards, Mount Steller was not climbed until recently. The first ascent was in 1992.

Climate

Based on the Köppen climate classification, Mount Steller is located in a subarctic climate zone with long, cold, snowy winters, and mild summers. Weather systems coming off the Gulf of Alaska are forced upwards by the Chugach Mountains (orographic lift), causing heavy precipitation in the form of rainfall and snowfall. Temperatures can drop below −20 °C with wind chill factors below −30 °C. The months May through June offer the most favorable weather for climbing or viewing.

See also

List of mountain peaks of North America
List of mountain peaks of the United States
List of mountain peaks of Alaska
List of Ultras of the United States

References

External links

 Mount Steller on Topozone
 Article about a massive landslide on Mount Steller
 Weather: Mount Steller

Steller, Mount (Chugach)
Mountains of Yakutat City and Borough, Alaska